Priscilla MacKenzie "Kenzie" Bok (born June 30, 1989) is a member of the Boston City Council, representing District 8, which includes Back Bay, Beacon Hill, Fenway–Kenmore, Mission Hill, and the West End. She is also a lecturer on Social Studies at Harvard University, where she teaches intellectual history and history of philosophy. Bok was elected to the City Council in the November 2019 election.

Early life
Bok was born in Boston on June 30, 1989 and grew up in the Bay Village neighborhood. Before her admission to Harvard in 2007, she had been educated at the John Winthrop School in Boston, the Park School, and Milton Academy (2007).

Academic career
Bok served as student president of the Kennedy Institute of Politics while she was a Harvard undergraduate, where in 2011 she earned her B.A. summa cum laude in intellectual history. In 2010, she was awarded a Marshall Scholarship, then continued studies at the University of Cambridge (St John's College), where she earned her M.Phil. in Political Thought & Intellectual History in 2012 and then her Ph.D. in History in 2016. While at Cambridge, she was awarded for her academic work the St John's Benefactors Scholarship, the Quentin Skinner Prize, the Sara Norton Prize, and the Thirwall Medal and Prince Consort Prize.

Bok is an intellectual historian who specializes in the young John Rawls and his path to writing A Theory of Justice. As a Harvard University lecturer on social policy and intellectual history, she also teaches a course on "Justice in Housing." She has published peer-reviewed articles on the philosopher John Rawls in Modern Intellectual History and the Journal of the History of Ideas.

Political career
Bok interned for the Barack Obama 2008 presidential campaign at its Chicago headquarters, then, following the election, was an intern in 2010 at the White House. She later served as Budget Director for Boston City Councilor-at-Large Annissa Essabi-George, and Senior Advisor for Policy and Planning for the Boston Housing Authority, the city agency focused on the management, preservation, and creation of low-income housing.

Boston City Council
Bok declared her candidacy for the Boston City Council in April 2019 following the decision of Josh Zakim to not seek a third term as councillor for District 8. PBS Boston affiliate WGBH described Bok as an "affordable housing expert and community leader" and as "senior adviser for policy and planning at the Boston Housing Authority and the former chair of Boston's Ward 5 Democratic Committee." At Harvard, where she is both a summa cum laude graduate and a lecturer, she teaches a course in "Justice and Housing" and serves on the board member at the Massachusetts Affordable Housing Alliance. Before the preliminary election, Bok was endorsed by The Boston Globe, U.S. Congresswoman Ayanna Pressley, and numerous local organizations and politicians.

In the September 2019 preliminary election, Bok received the largest percentage of votes for District 8 (50%), followed by Jennifer Nassour, former head of the Massachusetts Republican Party. In the November 2019 general election, Bok won the seat with 70% of the vote, and took office on January 6, 2020.

Personal life
Bok is a longtime member and vestry member at Trinity Church in Boston's Copley Square.

References

Alumni of St John's College, Cambridge
Harvard College alumni
Harvard University faculty
Historians of philosophy
Historians of the United States
People from Beacon Hill, Boston
Milton Academy alumni
Boston City Council members
1989 births
Living people
Women city councillors in Massachusetts
21st-century American politicians
21st-century American women politicians
American women academics